Muscle Ridge Islands is an archipelago and unorganized territory off the coast of South Thomaston in Knox County, Maine, United States. The population was 9 at the 2020 census.

Geography
According to the United States Census Bureau, the unorganized territory has a total area of 49.7 square miles (128.6 km2), of which 0.95 square miles (2.45 km2) is land and 48.7 square miles (126.2 km2) is water (98%). The archipelago includes over a dozen islands, including Andrews, Dix, Fisherman, Pleasant, Graffam, and Two Bush Island, which is home to the Two Bush Island Light.

References

Unorganized territories in Maine
Populated places in Knox County, Maine